The 2011 Portland State Vikings football team represented Portland State University in the 2011 NCAA Division I FCS football season. The Vikings were led by second year head coach Nigel Burton and played their home games at Jeld-Wen Field. They are a member of the Big Sky Conference. They finished the season 7–4, 5–3 in Big Sky play to finish in a tie for third place.

Schedule

References

Portland State
Portland State Vikings football seasons
Portland State Vikings football
Portland State Vikings football